Charles V. Ryan (September 15, 1927 – October 18, 2021) was an American politician who served as Mayor of Springfield, Massachusetts, from 1962 to 1967, and again from 2004 to 2008.

Ryan served as the city's mayor during the 1960s for three terms and for two additional terms beginning in 2004, making him the only Springfield mayor to serve in two different centuries.  His terms in the '60s occurred during a time of civil unrest and controversial urban renewal projects. Ryan was unsuccessful in preventing the closure of the Springfield Armory, a major economic blow to Springfield that he blamed on then Congressman Edward P. Boland. Ryan ran against Boland for Congress in 1968, but was defeated in a landslide. After leaving office he became a prominent attorney and continued to be active in public affairs, serving as a member of the downtown economic development group Springfield Central and leading efforts to successfully defeat attempts to institute casino gambling. He also led successful efforts to place the privately owned Springfield libraries under public control. 
 
He attempted to return to the mayoralty in 1995 but lost to city councilor Michael J. Albano. Ryan was elected mayor in 2003 following the decision of Albano not to seek reelection. He defeated the Albano endorsed State Senator Linda Melconian in a campaign that focused on the numerous corruption scandals of the Albano years. In November 2005, Ryan won reelection defeating the city's School Committee Vice-President, Thomas Ashe. On April 12, 2007, Ryan announced that he would run for re-election in the city's 2007 mayoral election and stated that this would be his final run. He lost this election to City Councilor Domenic Sarno.

Ryan died following a short illness on October 18, 2021, at the age of 94.

Electoral history

References

1927 births
2021 deaths
Mayors of Springfield, Massachusetts